Filyaty is a rural locality (a khutor) in Popovskoye Rural Settlement, Kumylzhensky District, Volgograd Oblast, Russia. The population was 7 as of 2010.

Geography 
Filyaty is located in forest steppe, on Khopyorsko-Buzulukskaya Plain, on the bank of the Khopyor River, 59 km northwest of Kumylzhenskaya (the district's administrative centre) by road. Fedoseyevskaya is the nearest rural locality.

References 

Rural localities in Kumylzhensky District